Nina Bratchikova and Oksana Kalashnikova were the defending champions from the last time the event was held at Pune in 2012, but Bratchikova has been inactive in the sport since 2014. Kalashnikova played alongside Veronika Kudermetova, but lost in the quarterfinals to Beatrice Gumulya and Ana Veselinović.

Victoria Rodriguez & Bibiane Schoofs won the title, defeating Dalila Jakupović & Irina Khromacheva in the final 7–5, 3–6, [10–7].

Seeds

Draw

References
Main Draw

Mumbai Open - Doubles